Blaen-pant is a small village in the  community of Beulah, Ceredigion, Wales, which is 71.5 miles (115 km) from Cardiff and 192.8 miles (310.3 km) from London. Blaen-pant is represented in the Senedd by Elin Jones (Plaid Cymru) and is part of the Ceredigion constituency in the House of Commons.

References

See also
List of localities in Wales by population

Villages in Ceredigion